Margaret Wotton, Marchioness of Dorset (1485 – 1539) was the second wife of Thomas Grey, 2nd Marquess of Dorset, and the mother of his children, including Henry Grey, 1st Duke of Suffolk, with whom she engaged in many quarrels during his minority over money and his allowance. Her lack of generosity to Henry shocked her peers as unmotherly, and inappropriate behaviour toward a high-ranking nobleman, relative of King Henry VIII of England. 

In 1534, she was compelled to answer to the charges that she was an "unnatural mother".

On 10 September 1533, she stood as one of the godmothers of the future Queen Elizabeth I of England. She was the subject of two portraits by Hans Holbein the Younger.
One of her many grandchildren was Lady Jane Grey.

Family 
Margaret was born in 1485, the daughter of Sir Robert Wotton of Boughton Malherbe, Kent, and Anne Belknap, daughter of Henry Belknap esquire, and sister of Sir Edward Belknap,  Two of her brothers held important positions in the government. Sir Edward Wotton was Treasurer of Calais, and Nicholas Wotton was a diplomat who arranged the marriage of Henry VIII to Anne of Cleves in 1539.

Marriages and issue 
In 1505, Margaret married her first husband, William Medley, esquire, by whom she had one son, George (died 1562). In 1509, sometime after the death of her husband in February of that year, she married as his second wife, Thomas Grey, 2nd Marquess of Dorset, the eldest son of Thomas Grey, 1st Marquess of Dorset by Cecily Bonville, Baroness Harington and Bonville. She was styled Marchioness of Dorset upon her marriage.

By her second husband she had four sons and four daughters:
Elizabeth Grey (1510–1564), who married firstly Thomas Audley, 1st Baron Audley of Walden by whom she had two daughters, including Margaret Audley, Duchess of Norfolk; she married secondly, George Norton.
Katherine Grey (1512 – 1 May 1542), who married Henry Fitzalan, 19th Earl of Arundel, by whom she had issue.
Anne Grey (d.1548), who married Sir Henry Willoughby (slain 27 August 1549 during Kett's Rebellion) of Wollaton, Nottinghamshire, by whom she had two sons, Thomas (d.1559) and Sir Francis, and a daughter, Margaret.
Henry Grey, 1st Duke of Suffolk (12 January 1517 – 23 February 1554), who married Lady Frances Brandon, by whom he had three daughters, including Lady Jane Grey, and Lady Katherine Grey. Executed for treason, together with his younger brother, Thomas, for having participated in Thomas Wyatt's rebellion in 1554.
 Lord John Grey of Pirgo (1523 – 19 November 1564) married Mary Browne, daughter of  Anthony Browne sometime before 1547 and became the father of Henry Grey, 1st Baron Grey of Groby and three daughters, Frances, Elizabeth and Jane.
Lord Thomas Grey (1526 – after 1554), who was executed together with his brother, Henry, for having participated in Thomas Wyatt's rebellion in 1554.. Lady Jane Grey was also executed at this time, though she had not taken part in the rebellion. 
Leonard Grey.
Mary Grey.

Margaret and her husband were part of the group who accompanied Henry VIII's sister, Princess Mary, to France in the autumn of 1514, for the latter's wedding to King Louis XII of France.

In October 1530, her husband died and she was given custody of all his property during their eldest son, Henry's minority.

On 10 September 1533 at Greenwich Palace, Margaret stood as one of the two godmothers of Princess Elizabeth, daughter of Henry VIII and Anne Boleyn, who would later rule as Queen Elizabeth I of England. Three months earlier, on 1 June, Margaret had ridden in Anne Boleyn's coronation procession from the Tower of London to Westminster Abbey.

She was the subject of two portraits by Hans Holbein the Younger.

Quarrels with her son 
Margaret first began a long series of quarrels with her son, who had succeeded to the Marquessate of Dorset in 1530, when he was forced to pay a fine of £4000 for breach of contract after he had renounced his betrothal to Katherine Fitzalan, daughter of the Earl of Arundel. As a result, she tried to restrict his allowance throughout his minority which caused much consternation from her peers, who labelled her actions "unmotherly", and inappropriate behaviour towards a nobleman closely related to the King. Margaret only agreed to Henry's marriage with Lady Frances Brandon, niece of the King, on the condition that her father, Charles Brandon, 1st Duke of Suffolk would support the couple until her son reached his majority.

In 1534, she felt compelled to answer charges that she was "an unnatural mother". As a result, she offered to contribute to her son's advancement "as my small power is and shall be".

Several years later when he came of age, Henry brought his quarrel with his mother before the Kings' Council, where she belatedly admitted that her son's allowance was not "meet or sufficient to maintain his estate", and she offered to increase it. Henry was not appeased, therefore she moved out of the Grey family seat at Bradgate House; however, Henry would not let her remove her personal property, so she wrote a letter to Thomas Cromwell, pleading with him to order her son to release her goods.

A letter signed by Margaret on 18 April 1539 and addressed to Thomas Cromwell indicates that she was still living on that date. Her son Henry Grey obtained the reversion of the estates she had held during her widowhood on 12 July 1539, so that she must have died between late April and early July 1539.

Notes

References
 

1485 births
1539 deaths
English marchionesses
Grey family
16th-century English women
16th-century English nobility
15th-century English women
15th-century English people
People from Boughton Malherbe
Wives of knights